Oliver Stierle (born 13 June 1983) is a German footballer who plays for SV Göppingen.

Position
Stierle played as a midfielder for the majority of his career but more recently he has been deployed as a defender.

External links

1983 births
Living people
German footballers
Stuttgarter Kickers players
Stuttgarter Kickers II players
FC Bayern Munich II players
Association football midfielders
Association football defenders
3. Liga players
Footballers from Stuttgart